The Afghanistan Freedom Front (AFF) is an anti-Taliban militant group operating in Afghanistan. In some parts of Afghanistan, the AFF and National Resistance Front (NRF) collaborate on anti-Taliban operations.

The AFF has reportedly tried to recruit pro-NRF fighters, putting in perspective the NRF's appeal being limited to Tajiks and pro-Jamiat e Islami groups.

History
In March 2022, the AFF announced its formation to the public via social media.

On 14 April, the AFF reported that its fighters have engaged Taliban forces simultaneously in Badakhshan, Baghlan, Kandahar, Parwan, Takhar, Laghman and Samangan.

On 5 July, the AFF killed six Taliban soldiers and wounded two in a missile attack on Bagram Airfield. A Taliban military vehicle was also destroyed. On 15 July, AFF fighters fought off a Taliban incursion in Khost wa Farang district.

On 6 October 2022, there were claims that AFF fighters in Kandahar had assassinated a Taliban commander.

On 10 March 2023, AFF detonated an IED on Taliban forces, killing 3 at Police Station District 5 in Kabul.

Leadership
According to Voice of America, Yasin Zia is reported to be one of the leaders. He is reportedly working with NRF officials, including Ahmad Massoud to get weapons and support for an anti-Taliban front. This includes traveling to get support for the AFF.

Locations
According to an AFF representative, the group is mobile, but operates in Salang valley in Parwan province; the Andarab and Khost-Farang districts in Baghlan province; the Ishkamish district in Takhar province as well as Sar-e-Pol, Nuristan, and Faryab provinces.

References

2022 in Afghanistan
Afghanistan conflict (1978–present)
Rebel groups in Afghanistan
Organizations established in 2022
Resistance movements